Rugelach (or  and  rōgalaḵ) is a filled baked confection originating in the Jewish communities of Poland. It is popular in Israel, commonly found in most cafes and bakeries. It is also a popular treat among Jews in the diaspora.

Traditional rugelach are made in the form of a crescent by rolling a triangle of dough around a filling.  Some sources state that the rugelach and the French croissant share a common Viennese ancestor, crescent-shaped pastries commemorating the lifting of the Turkish siege, possibly a reference to the Battle of Vienna in 1683. This appears to be an urban legend however, as both the rugelach and its supposed ancestor, the Kipferl, pre-date the Early Modern era, while the croissant in its modern form did not originate earlier than the 19th century (see viennoiserie). This leads many to believe that the croissant is simply a descendant of one of these two.

An alternative form is constructed much like a strudel or nut roll, but unlike those, the rolled dough and filling are cut into slices before baking.

Etymology
The name is Yiddish, the historical language of Ashkenazi Jews. In this case, the root means something like "twist" so the translation would be "little twists," a reference to the shape of this pastry. In this context, note that  means "corner" in Yiddish. In Polish, which influenced Yiddish,  can mean "corner", but can also mean "horn" – both the kind on an animal and the musical instrument. Croissant-shaped pastries, which look like horns, are called  in Polish, see .  is almost identical in pronunciation and meaning to the Yiddish word .

This explanation is in conflict with Yiddish usage, where the word  is the dominant word meaning "royal".

Ingredients

Rugelach can be made with sour cream or cream cheese doughs, but there are also pareve variants (with no dairy ingredients), so that it can be eaten with or after a meat meal and still be kosher.  Cream cheese doughs are the most recent, while yeast leavened and sour cream doughs are much older.

The different fillings can include raisins, walnuts, cinnamon, chocolate, marzipan, poppy seed, or fruit preserves which are rolled up inside. Vanilla-filled rugelach have become popular in New York in recent decades.

In recent years, chefs have introduced savory versions of these pastries, filled with chicken and schmaltz or salmon and boursin cheese.

See also

 Ashkenazi Jewish cuisine
 Israeli cuisine
 Jewish cuisine
 American Jewish cuisine
 Culture of Israel

Other crescent pastries and rolls 

 Croissant
 Kifli

Other fruit-filled pastries 

 Hamantash
 Bourekas
 Ma'amoul
 Kolach
 Krantz cake

References

Further  reading

External links
 
 "Rugelach—Elsie Waldman's Recipe" from The Jewish Cookbook by Mildred Grosberg Bellin

Ashkenazi Jewish cuisine
Polish cuisine
Israeli pastries
Jewish baked goods
Pastries with poppy seeds
Foods with jam